Kimberly Geist (born April 29, 1987) is an American professional racing cyclist. She rode at the 2015 UCI Track Cycling World Championships, winning the bronze medal in the points race.

Major results

2013
2nd Team Pursuit, Los Angeles Grand Prix (with Sarah Hammer, Jennifer Valente and Ruth Winder)
2014
1st  Team Pursuit, Pan American Track Championships (with Amber Gaffney, Elizabeth Newell and Jennifer Valente)
1st Points Race, Festival of Speed
2nd Scratch Race, Keirin Revenge
3rd Scratch Race, US Sprint GP
3rd Points Race, Fastest Man on Wheels
2015
1st Scratch Race, US Sprint GP
1st Points Race, Festival of Speed
1st Individual Pursuit, Grand Prix of Colorado Springs
2nd Points Race, Pan American Track Championships
2017
1st Madison, Öschelbronn (with Kimberly Zubris)
3rd Madison, Oberhausen (with Kimberly Zubris)

References

External links
 

1987 births
Living people
American female cyclists
Sportspeople from Allentown, Pennsylvania
UCI Track Cycling World Champions (women)
American track cyclists
Cyclists at the 2019 Pan American Games
Pan American Games medalists in cycling
Pan American Games gold medalists for the United States
Medalists at the 2019 Pan American Games
21st-century American women
Cyclists from Pennsylvania